Beny Jene Primm (May 21, 1928 – October 16, 2015) was a prominent American physician, HIV/AIDS researcher, lecturer and advocate for public health policy reform.

Primm was born in Williamson, West Virginia, and earned his Bachelor of Science from West Virginia State College in 1950, before moving to Europe to undertake graduate studies at the University of Heidelberg in Germany and the University of Geneva in Switzerland, earning his Doctor of Medicine from the latter in 1959.

In 1963, Primm began working as an anaesthesiologist at Harlem Hospital, and during this time he began to specialise in drug addiction treatment and prevention. In 1969, he co-founded the Addiction Research and Treatment Corporation in New York, which opened six branches as well as a treatment centre in Brooklyn. A major project of the A. R. T. C. was to determine the safety and effectiveness of methadone as a substitute for heroin, to help addicts recover. Primm combined this treatment with social and psychiatric services. In 1981 he founded the Urban Resource Institute, an organisation offering career counselling and human resources for drug addicts.

Primm was a leading figure in the fight against HIV/AIDS during the 80s, and an early proponent of preventative measures such as clean needle programs, personal HIV/AIDS status testing and safe sex. From 1987, he served on the Presidential Commission on the Human Immunodeficiency Virus Epidemic under Ronald Reagan, where he personally added to the commission's 600-point plan of action a recommendation for treatment to be given on demand to intravenous drug users.

Primm was later appointed to the National Drug Abuse Advisory Council, and headed the Office of Treatment Improvement, an agency of the government's Alcohol, Drug Abuse, and Mental Health Services Administration. He also served on the Presidential Advisory Council on HIV/AIDS.

Primm was not only an advocate for public health reform but also for civil rights and equality. In 2014, the year before his death, he released his memoir, which he co-authored with John S. Friedman, entitled The Healer: A Doctor’s Crusade Against Addiction and AIDS.

Footnotes

References

External links

1928 births
20th-century American physicians
21st-century American physicians
2015 deaths
Activists for African-American civil rights
Activists from West Virginia
African-American founders
American founders
African Americans in West Virginia
American anesthesiologists
American health activists
American immunologists
HIV/AIDS activists
HIV/AIDS researchers
People from Williamson, West Virginia
Physicians from West Virginia
20th-century African-American physicians
21st-century African-American physicians
West Virginia State University alumni